Central High School, of Fargo, North Dakota, was the first public high school in Fargo.

Central High School served grades 9-12, while Central School served K-8. CHS was built originally in the early 1800s, but became "finalized" and had was moved to 2nd Ave South in 1921. Central was the second high school on the site. The first school opened in 1892, but was destroyed by fire on Dec. 28, 1916. Thousands of people were reported to at least briefly have stopped to watch firefighters fight the fire in temperatures that dipped to 8 degrees below zero, according to Forum reports. After the old building was razed, the second Central High was opened for the 1920-21 school year. Superintendent Arthur Deaner called it modern and, in what now appears to be an ironic twist, "fireproof throughout." On the afternoon of April 19, 1966, a teacher holding a study hall with 51 students in the theater heard crackling, and popping- the upper story of the school had started on fire. Students were alarmed to know that the evacuation was not a drill, when Dr. Otto Rupert Lupas, announced over the Public Address System that the school was in fact, on fire. After 4 hours of taming the flames, fire fighters went in to inspect the school. It is recorded that the school faced $1 million in damage, however no students or teachers were injured. Several off-duty teachers managed to save the 12 file cabinets containing permanent records, and the students continued the school year at North High School and other locations within the city.

In the summer of 1966, the Fargo Public School Board granted and approved the beginning construction for what is now Fargo South and Fargo North High Schools. Today, the only thing that FCH is remembered by is the Cass County Annex, located on 2nd Ave. The Annex serves as part of the court system, however it lies on the grounds which were once Central High School. The "CENTRAL HIGH SCHOOL" wooden sign still stands in the lot, and there are several trees planted in memory from Central graduates.

External links

Defunct schools in North Dakota
Schools in Cass County, North Dakota